Sun Journal may refer to the following newspapers:

 Sun Journal (Lewiston, Maine) of Lewiston, Maine
 Sun Journal (New Bern, North Carolina) of New Bern, North Carolina